HEAT is Kim Hyun-joong's second Japanese single. There are five available versions of this single, three of which include the song "Let's Party" in addition to the CD's title track "Heat".

For "Heat" Kim Hyun-joong collaborated with Japanese rock duo B'z.

Although there are music videos for both, "Heat" and "Let's Party", the latter song was not promoted on TV programs.

The songs will be featured on Kim Hyun-joong's upcoming Japanese album Unlimited.

Heat reached #31 on Oricon's Yearly Single Chart, having sold 202,672 copies.

Track listing

Jackets A, B (both Limited Editions) and E (Normal Edition)

Jackets C and D (both Limited Editions)

Music videos
 "Heat"
 "Let's Party"

Release history

Promotion

TV programs
NHK Music Japan: "Heat" (2012/7/1)
Fuji TV Non Stop: "Heat" (2012/7/4)
NTV Happy Music: "Heat" (2012/7/6)
Fuji TV Hey! Hey! Hey! Music Champ: "Heat" (2012/8/20)

Guerilla performances
Tokyo (Odaiba Diver City): "Let's Party" (2012/7/4)
Nagoya (Sunshine Sakae, Central Park, Oasis 21): "Let's Party" (2012/7/8)

Charts

References

External links
 
 
 

SS501 songs
2012 singles
Oricon Weekly number-one singles
Japanese-language songs
Songs written by Tak Matsumoto
2012 songs
Songs written by Koshi Inaba
Universal Music Japan singles